Ellington is a town in Tolland County, Connecticut, United States. Ellington was incorporated in May 1786, from East Windsor. As of the 2020 census, the town population was 16,426.

History
Originally the area in what is now Ellington was named by the natives as “Weexskashuck” which translates to “Great Marsh”. The earliest settlers called the area Great Marsh or Goshen. In 1671, the town of Windsor, purchased the land of East Windsor and Ellington from the Native Americans to recover land loss from the Connecticut-Massachusetts border dispute. Though no one attempted to settle the fertile lands for another 50 years. Samuel Pinney was the first settler in today's Ellington (Pinney Road bears his name in town). In 1733, Ellington was established as a Parish of the town of Windsor. East Windsor then split off from Windsor and held land in what is today's East Windsor, South Windsor and Ellington in May 1768. Ellington split off twenty years later and incorporated itself in May 1786. Mostly known as an agricultural community, the Crystal Lake section of town was for a while a popular summer resort location.  Ellington still has a significant amount of property dedicated to agriculture including cattle and corn farming.

Ellington's sole representative to the voting on the adoption of the United States Constitution by Connecticut was Ebenezer Nash. Nash was an anti-federalist and voted against the ratification, which passed 128–40.

Ellington is home to one of America's oldest roadside memorials, remembering a boy killed in a road accident.  A stone in the southwest corner of the town marks the site where Samuel Knight was killed "by a cartwheel rolling over his head in the 10th year of his age, Nov 8, 1812". The Christian hymn, "I love to steal awhile away" was written by Phoebe Hinsdale Brown in Ellington based on a personal experience in August 1818.

During the late 19th century and early 20th century, Ellington became the center of a community of Jewish immigrant farmers who were settled there by the philanthropist Baron Maurice de Hirsch's Jewish Colonization Association. They built a synagogue, Congregation Knesseth Israel, that is still standing and in use by an active Modern Orthodox congregation today and is on the National Register of Historic Places.

On January 1, 1967, Ellington made national news when its residents assisted the city fire department in rescuing a pilot whose plane was having engine trouble and was unable to locate a runway in a fog that cut visibility to 200 feet.  Under the direction and quick thinking of Resident State Trooper, Lionel Labreche, Connecticut State Police,  dozens of people assembled at the town's unlit airstrip, Hyde Field, and illuminated the runway with their headlights, allowing the pilot to land safely.

In 1991, Ellington was proposed as a potential site for a low-level nuclear waste dump. Strong dissent from area residents forced the state to abandon the plan.

As it enters the 21st century, Ellington has had the 6th fastest growth rate of all the towns in Connecticut, and has been experiencing changes in growing from a rural farming town into a suburban community. Exemplative of this change was the displacement of the locally owned Ellington Supermarket by competition from the regional Big Y supermarket chain when a new Big Y was built adjacent to the older supermarket. An independent film entitled The Supermarket, was made about the incident.

Geography

Ellington is bordered by the towns of East Windsor, South Windsor, Vernon, Tolland, Willington, Stafford, Somers, and Enfield.

The town has a panhandle extending to the east that extends to the Willimantic River and encompasses Crystal Lake. A large portion of the town's eastern portion is occupied by the Shenipsit State Forest which is bounded on the south by Shenipsit Lake and on the north by Soapstone Mountain.

Neighborhoods
Crystal Lake
Ellington Center
Sadd's Mill
Highland Ave
Windermere
Woodside Acres
Mosley Plains
Gasek Farms
Crystal Ridge

Demographics

As of the census of 2000, there were 12,921 people, 5,195 households, and 3,470 families residing in the town. Ellington's population increased 20.8% between 2000 and 2010, making one of just four municipalities in Connecticut to achieve a growth rate of at least 20% for that period. The racial makeup of the town was 96.23% White, 0.99% African American, 0.16% Native American, 1.29% Asian, 0.01% Pacific Islander, 0.44% from other races, and 0.87% from two or more races. Hispanic or Latino of any race were 1.40% of the population.

There were 5,195 households, out of which 32.5% had children under the age of 18 living with them, 57.4% were married couples living together, 6.6% had a female householder with no husband present, and 33.2% were non-families. 26.8% of all households were made up of individuals, and 6.4% had someone living alone who was 65 years of age or older.  The average household size was 2.48 and the average family size was 3.06.

In the town, the population was spread out, with 25.2% under the age of 18, 6.5% from 18 to 24, 35.0% from 25 to 44, 23.6% from 45 to 64, and 9.7% who were 65 years of age or older.  The median age was 37 years. For every 100 females, there were 98.9 males.  For every 100 females age 18 and over, there were 96.3 males.

The median income for a household in the town was $62,405, and the median income for a family was $77,813. Males had a median income of $47,334 versus $32,460 for females. The per capita income for the town was $27,766.  About 2.7% of families and 3.6% of the population were below the poverty line, including 4.1% of those under age 18 and 3.9% of those age 65 or over.

Economy
Ellington is a rapidly growing community, and is going through the process of suburbanization, which is related to the phenomenon of urban sprawl.

Education
Ellington Public Schools belong to the Ellington Public Schools school district. The district has five public schools:

Elementary schools
Center School (K–6)
Crystal Lake School (K–6)
Windermere School (K–6)

Middle school
Ellington Middle School, formerly Longview Middle School (7–8)

High school
Ellington High School

Infrastructure

Roads

Though no Interstate Highways run through it, Ellington is approximately equidistant to both Interstate 84 and Interstate 91, each being about a ten- to fifteen-minute drive from most parts of town.

Several Connecticut State Roads run through town:
 Connecticut Route 30 – (Stafford Rd.) The north–south arterial in the Crystal Lake section of town.
 Connecticut Route 83 – (West Rd. & Somers Rd.) The main north–south arterial running through the middle of the town.
 Connecticut Route 74 – (Wapping Wood Rd. & Windsorville Rd.) On the Southern edge of town, a major road in Ellington's Five corners.
 Connecticut Route 140 – (Sadds Mill Rd., Maple St., Crystal Lake Rd., & Sandy Beach Rd.) The town's main East/West arterial, running the complete width of town.
 Connecticut Route 286 – (Pinney St. & Main St.) An arterial running North from Five Corners to the center of town where it turns East and becomes Ellington's Main St.

Rail
Ellington was formerly served by a seven-mile-long rail line built in 1876 running from Vernon to Melrose, that roughly paralleled Pinney St. and Sadds Mill Rd. The rail line became defunct in the middle part of the 20th century.

Airports

 Ellington Airport – A General aviation airport located adjacent to the town's Industrial park on Route 83. In addition to private aviation, a Flight training school and a helicopter school operate there. Parachuting is a common weekend activity from the airport.
 Skylark Airpark – A General aviation airport located in the neighboring town of East Windsor.
 Bradley International Airport – Connecticut's main commercial airport, is located approximately ten miles West of town in Windsor Locks.

Water
Crystal Lake, in the Eastern section of town, is used by many for Recreational boating.

Notable people

 John H. Brockway (1801–1870), a U.S. Representative
 Henry Billings Brown (1836–1913), US Supreme Court justice
 Orlow W. Chapman (1832–1890), politician; Solicitor General of the United States
 Austin Cornelius Dunham, businessman who grew up in the town
 Stephen Jenks (1772–1856), composer of music
 Mike Massaro, NASCAR on NBC pit reporter and journalist
 Frank Mozzicato (born 2003), 7th overall pick of the 2021 MLB draft, signing with the Kansas City Royals
 Steve Park (born 1967), winner in the NASCAR Cup Series on multiple occasions
 Sapna Raghavan, Miss Connecticut 2021
 Henry Weston Smith (1827–1876), Methodist preacher
 Mike Vranos (born 1961), founder of the hedge fund Ellington Management Company

See also

Congregation Knesseth Israel
Crystal Lake, Connecticut
Country Pure Foods

References

External links
 

Town of Ellington Connecticut Portal style website, Government, Business, Library, Recreation and more
City-Data.com Comprehensive Statistical Data and more about Tipton

There are three different public elementary schools in Ellington,ct the schools are, center school, windermere, and crystal lake. There is also one public middle school, and a public high school.

 
Populated places established in 1786
Towns in Tolland County, Connecticut
Towns in Connecticut
Greater Hartford